The 2000 Hopman Cup (also known as the Hyundai Hopman Cup for sponsorship reasons) corresponds to the 17th edition of the Hopman Cup tournament between nations in men's and women's tennis. Nine teams participated in the World Group.

The 2000 Hopman Cup was a tennis championship won by South Africa's Amanda Coetzer and Wayne Ferreira. Coetzer and Ferreira defeated Thailand (Tamarine Tanasugarn and Paradorn Srichaphan) in the final at the Burswood Entertainment Complex in Perth, Western Australia from 1 January through 8 January 2000.

Teams
 – Amanda Coetzer and 'Wayne Ferreira (champions) – Tamarine Tanasugarn and Paradorn Srichaphan (finalists) – Åsa Carlsson and Jonas Björkman 
 – Alexandra Stevenson and James Blake
 – Dominique Van Roost and Xavier Malisse
 – Barbara Schett and Stefan Koubek
 – Jelena Dokić and Mark Philippoussis
 – Henrieta Nagyová and Karol Kučera (qualified) – Ai Sugiyama and Takao Suzuki (lost play-off)''

Play-off

Thailand vs. Japan

Group A

Standings

Austria vs. Slovakia

Thailand vs. Australia

Australia vs. Austria

Thailand vs. Slovakia

Austria vs. Thailand

Japan (replacing Slovakia) vs. Australia

Group B

Standings

South Africa vs. Belgium

Sweden vs. United States

South Africa vs. Sweden

United States vs. Belgium

South Africa vs. United States

Belgium vs. Sweden

Final

South Africa vs. Thailand

External links

Hopman Cup
2000